Borsi may refer to:

People
Maria Luigia Borsi, Italian opera singer
Teresa De Giuli Borsi, born Maria Teresa Pippeo (1817–1877), Italian opera singer
Veronica Borsi (1987), Italian hurdler

Toponyms
Borsh, a village in southern Albania
Borsh Castle, a castle near the village Borsh, Albania
Borsi, Greece, a village in the northern part of Elis, Greece
Borsi, the Hungarian name for the village Borša, eastern Slovakia
Borsi Colony, a quarter of the city of Durg, India

Italian-language surnames